HMS Flycatcher was a stone frigate name for the Royal Navy's headquarters for its Mobile Naval Air Bases which supported their Fleet Air Arm units.

Flycatcher was based first at RNAS Ludham, Norfolk then moved to Middle Wallop.

On 1 April 1947 Kai Tak Airport in Hong Kong was recommissioned as HMS Flycatcher.

The previous HMS Flycatcher was an ex-Turkish motor patrol boat. Built in 1912 by Thornycroft, she was sunk on 9 November 1914 by HMS Espiegle in Shatt-al-Arab, salvaged, and returned to service late 1915, armed with 1 6-pounder gun and 1 machine gun. Sold c1923.

See also
List of air stations of the Royal Navy

References

External links

Royal Navy bases in England
Military in Norfolk